The South Florida Bulls track and field program represents the University of South Florida in the sport of track and field. The program consists of separate men's and women's teams and competes in the American Athletic Conference within NCAA Division I. Both of the Bulls track and field teams are coached by Erik Jenkins, who is also the coach of the Bulls cross country teams. The teams practice and host outdoor meets at the USF Track and Field Stadium. While the university sponsors indoor teams as well, the university does not have an indoor track facility suitable to host meets. There is an indoor track in the Campus Recreation Center which the teams use for practice, but it has no space for indoor field events or spectators.

Neither team has won a team national title, but the men's team has featured three individual national championships: Jon Dennis won the outdoor 5000-meter run in 1992 and 1993 and Romaine Beckford won the indoor high jump in 2023.

Men 
The USF men's outdoor track and field team was founded in spring 1992, and the indoor team was founded in spring 1994. They have made two appearances in the NCAA Division I Men's Indoor Track and Field Championships and seven appearances in the NCAA Division I Men's Outdoor Track and Field Championships. Members of the team have won 26 individual indoor and 48 individual outdoor conference championships, plus three relay indoor and three relay outdoor conference championships.

Jon Dennis won the 1992 and 1993 national championships in the outdoor 5,000 meter run, and Romaine Beckford won the 2023 national championship in the indoor high jump. Matthew O'Neal was the national runner-up in the 2016 indoor triple jump.

Women 
The USF women's outdoor and indoor track and field teams were also founded in 1992 and 1994, respectively. They have won three indoor and three outdoor team conference championships and appeared in six NCAA Division I Women's Indoor Track and Field Championships and seven NCAA Division I Women's Outdoor Track and Field Championships. Members of the team have won 39 individual indoor and 53 individual outdoor conference championships, plus two relay indoor and eight relay outdoor conference championships.

Two women's athletes have finished as NCAA runners up: Tara Quinn in the 2002 outdoor 10,000 meter run and Courtney Anderson in the 2013 outdoor high jump.

Athletes

All-Americans 
The men's program has produced 14 first team all-American selections from seven athletes, while the women's program has produced 13 first team selections from six athletes and one relay team.

Men's first team all-Americans 

 Jon Dennis (1992 outdoor 5,000 meter run, 1993 outdoor 5,000 meter run)
 Jimmy Baxter (2001 outdoor high jump, 2004 outdoor high jump)
 Jan-Erik Solo (2001 outdoor steeplechase)
 Mikese Morse (2008 outdoor long jump)
 David Aristil (2010 outdoor 400-meter hurdles, 2011 outdoor 400-meter hurdles, 2012 outdoor 400-meter hurdles)
 Jared Thomas (2012 outdoor discus)
 Matthew O'Neal (2013 outdoor triple jump, 2014 outdoor triple jump, 2015 indoor triple jump, 2015 outdoor triple jump, 2016 indoor triple jump, 2016 outdoor triple jump)

Women's first team all-Americans 

 Kerine Black (2000 outdoor triple jump, 2000 indoor triple jump, 2001 indoor long jump)
 Kerine Black, Damu Cherry, Maiteland Marks, Sasha Springer, Amber Williams (2000 outdoor 4x100 meter relay)
 Tara Quinn (2002 outdoor 10,000 meter run)
 Chandra Brewer (2003 outdoor shot put, 2005 outdoor shot put)
 Dayana Octavien (2004 outdoor discus, 2004 indoor weight throw)
 Denise von Eynatten (2008 indoor pole vault, 2011 indoor pole vault)
 Courtney Anderson (2013 outdoor high jump, 2014 outdoor high jump)

USF Athletic Hall of Fame 

Three track and field athletes have been inducted into the University of South Florida Athletic Hall of Fame, two women and one man:

 Kerine Black, 1997–2001
 Dayana Octavien, 2000–04
 Matthew O'Neal, 2012–16

Olympians 
Five Bulls track and field athletes have competed in the Olympics:

  Llewelyn Bredwood, 2000
  Kemel Thompson, 2000, 2004
  Damu Cherry, 2008
  Dayana Octavien, 2008
  Sasha Springer-Jones, 2008

As of the 2020 Summer Olympics, no Bulls have won any Olympic medals in track & field.

See also 
University of South Florida
South Florida Bulls
South Florida Bulls cross country

References 

South Florida Bulls
Sports in the Tampa Bay area